The Concordat of 1993 is an agreement between the Holy See of the Roman Catholic Church and Poland. The concordat was signed on 28 July 1993 between the archbishop and Vatican nuncio to Poland, Józef Kowalczyk, and Polish Foreign Minister Krzysztof Skubiszewski. However, the treaty was ratified by the Polish Sejm only on 1 January 1998, signed by Polish president Aleksander Kwaśniewski and Pope John Paul II on 23 February 1998, and enacted on 25 April 1998.

Bibliography
Concordat Watch - Poland (includes full text of Concordat)

Legal history of Poland
Catholic Church in Poland
1993
Treaties concluded in 1993
Treaties entered into force in 1998
Treaties of Poland